The Fraunhofer Institute for High-Speed Dynamics (German: Fraunhofer-Institut für Kurzzeitdynamik), commonly known as the  Ernst Mach Institute and also by the abbreviation Fraunhofer EMI, is a facility of the Fraunhofer Society in Germany. The Institute is based in Freiburg im Breisgau. Its activities are applied research and development in the fields of materials science and high-speed measurement techniques. The Institute also has offices in Efringen-Kirchen and Kandern.

The name "Ernst Mach Institute" is named for the physicist Ernst Mach (1838–1916), who first used high-speed photography to visualize ballistic and gas-dynamic processes.

See also
NEOShield

External links 
http://www.emi.fraunhofer.de/

Laboratories in Germany
Fraunhofer Society